Richard Pierpoint (Bundu  – Canada ), also known as Black Dick, Captain Dick, Captain Pierpoint, Pawpine, and Parepoint was a British soldier of Senegalese descent. Brought to America as a slave, he was granted freedom to fight on the side of the British in the American Revolution. After the war he settled in a Black community in Upper Canada, where he was given some land. He also participated in the War of 1812.

Butler's Rangers

Richard Pierpoint was born about 1744 in Bundu in what is now Senegal. When he was about sixteen he was captured and sold into slavery. Surviving the Middle Passage across the Atlantic, Pierpoint was sold to a British officer in colonial North America named Pierpoint, probably in one of the New England Colonies. Richard Pierpoint would have acted as his personal servant.

In 1776, with the outbreak of the American Revolution, many African American slaves were offered freedom in exchange for fighting on the side of the British.  By at least 1780 Pierpoint was one of about a dozen Africans fighting with the Butler's Rangers regiment. Some members of the regiment were former black slaves, which enlisted blacks only as non-combatant laborers or sappers. The total number of black soldiers in Butler's Rangers is unknown.

Pierpoint's Settlement
Following the British defeat the Rangers settled in Niagara. Among the Loyalists who came to Upper Canada (where they were given the name United Empire Loyalists) were several hundred Blacks (the "Black Loyalists"). Blacks represented about 10% of the total Loyalist emigration.  Communities such as Buxton and the Queen's Bush Settlement were examples of how Blacks created communities and helped develop many of the communities in Southern Ontario.
Blacks were entitled to the same proportion of land as their fellow Loyalists only if they fought for the British as a freeman. Others of African descent were not included as Loyalists.

The City of St. Catharines was first settled by Loyalists in the 1780s. Early histories credit Serjeant Jacob Dittrick and Private John Hainer formerly of Butler's Rangers, among the first to come to the area taking up their Crown Patents where Dick's Creek and 12 Mile Creek merge, now the city centre of St. Catharines. Although never documented, some St. Catharines' historians have concluded that Dick's Creek was named after Richard Pierpoint, a Black Loyalist.

Under normal circumstances, a private would have only received a grant of  so the reason for the additional  of the grant is open to speculation. Additionally, he might have been considered a United Empire Loyalist and thereby entitled to an additional . Alternatively, he may have had family with him, each family member being allotted an additional . There is some evidence that Pierpoint did not arrive alone as victualling records from 1786 indicate that a woman accompanied him. Pierpoint didn't appear on either an assessment or census and no documentary evidence exists to explain the situation. Conversely, his participation in the Petition of Free Negroes and subsequent sale or abandonment of his grant suggests he may have been single, at least by 1794.

In 1794 Pierpont signed the Petition of Free Negroes to Lieutenant Governor John Graves Simcoe requesting that freed Blacks who had served as soldiers be given land grants adjacent to each other so that the former comrades could help each other with land clearing as many lacked the large families necessary to clear the land on their own. The Petition was read by the Executive Council of Upper Canada Government on July 8, 1794, and dismissed. Pierpoint subsequently abandoned or sold his grant and supported himself as a labourer.

The War of 1812
Following the outbreak of the War of 1812, Pierpoint proposed to organize a Corps of Men of Colour on the Niagara frontier. His offer was refused, but a small Black corps was raised locally by a white officer, Jordan tavern-owner Robert Runchey. Pierpoint volunteered immediately for Captain Runchey's Company of Coloured Men even though he was in his sixties. The corps served with distinction at the Battle of Queenston Heights, the siege of Fort George and the Battle of Lundy's Lane as well as other engagements. They were also instrumental in the construction of Fort Mississauga. For the remainder of the war the corps was used for labour and garrison duty.

Petition 
Pierpoint's unit was honourably disbanded in 1815. As a veteran, Pierpoint was entitled to a 100-acre grant of old growth forest. In his late 70s, in 1821 Pierpoint petitioned Lieutenant Governor Maitland for passage back to his homeland in Senegal instead of the land grant. A certificate from the Adjutant General Nathaniel Coffin was attached.

The Petition of Richard Pierpoint, now of the Town of Niagara, a Man of Colour, a native of Africa, and an inhabitant of this Province since the year 1780.

Most humbly showeth,

That Your Excellency's Petitioner is a native of Bondu in Africa; that at the age of Sixteen Years he was made a Prisoner and sold as a Slave; that he was conveyed [transported] to America about the year 1760, and sold to a British officer; that he served his Majesty [King George III] during the American Revolutionary War in the Corps called Butler's Rangers; and again during the late American War in a Corps of Colour raised on the Niagara Frontier.

That Your Excellency's Petitioner is now old and without property; that he finds it difficult to obtain a livelihood by his labour; that he is above all things desirous to return to his native Country; that His Majesty's Government be graciously pleased to grant him any relief, he wishes it may be by affording him the means to proceed to England and from thence to a Settlement near the Gambia or Senegal Rivers, from whence he could return to Bondu ...

York Upper Canada
21st July 1821 

His request was denied and instead Pierpoint and several other Coloured Corps veterans, were given land grants in Garafraxa, just outside present-day Fergus.

Grant to Richard Pierpoint of the Township of Grantham in the County of Lincoln in the Niagara District, farmer -- as a private in the Coloured Corps under Captain Runchey and Lieutenant Robertson -- the easterly half of Lot No. 6 in the 1st Concession of the Township of Garafraxa -- containing one hundred acres.

A "land ticket" was issued to him on July 30, 1822.  Pierpoint would only get full ownership of the plot once he had cleared at least  of trees, cleared a road to the plot and built a house:

The whole to be performed within two years from the date of the ticket. Note The Settlement duty performed as attested & admitted. 15 Sept. 1826. Sig. T. Ridout.

The farm was probably a settlement for a number of Black settlers, but the exact number is unknown. Very few records were left and even orally transmitted history is limited.

Pierpoint died sometime before September 1838, leaving no family or heirs. It is not known where he was buried. His will left the Garafraxa property to Lemuel Brown. Brown, who lived in the Guelph area at the time of Pierpoint's death, sold the land to the neighbouring farmer.

References

Sources

External links

1744 births
1838 deaths
18th-century American slaves
Black Loyalists
Canadian people of Senegalese descent
African Americans in the American Revolution
Underground Railroad people
Senegalese people
American people of Senegalese descent
Pre-Confederation Ontario people
Canadian people of the War of 1812
British Army personnel of the War of 1812
Loyalist military personnel of the American Revolutionary War
United Empire Loyalists